Puya coerulea is a species of plant in the genus Puya. This species is endemic to Chile.

Subspecies
 P. c. var. violacea (Brongniart) Smith 
 P. c. var. monteroana (Smith & Looser) Smith & Looser 
 P. c. var. intermedia (Smith & Looser) Smith & Looser

References

Chilean Bromeliaceae: diversity, distribution and evaluation of conservation status (Published online: 10 March 2009)

coerulea
Endemic flora of Chile